On the Case with Paula Zahn is an American documentary and news program broadcast on Investigation Discovery since October 18, 2009. The program explores in-depth stories of crime mysteries and interviews with involved individuals, closest to the cases and includes expert analysis. Emmy Award winning journalist and former CNN anchor Paula Zahn is the program host who travels throughout the country interviewing people directly affected by the tragic cases.

On the Case with Paula Zahn is the first series on Investigation Discovery to reach over 360 episodes.

Episodes

Season 1 (2009–10)

Season 2 (2010)

Season 3 (2010–11)

Season 4 (2011)

Season 5 (2011–12)

Season 6 (2012)

Season 7 (2012–13)

Season 8 (2013)

Season 9 (2013–14)

Season 10 (2014)

Season 11 (2015)

Season 12 (2015–16)

Season 13 (2016)

Season 14 (2016–17)

Season 15 (2017)

Season 16 (2017–18)

Season 17 (2018)

Season 18 (2019)

Season 19 (2019–20)

Season 20 (2020)

Season 21 (2020–21)

Season 22 (2021)

Season 23 (2021)

Season 24 (2022)

Season 25 (2022–23)

References

Further reading
Death in the Desert by crime author Cathy Scott ("A Death in the Desert" episode, November 2009)
Through the Window by crime author Diane Fanning ("A Mother's Nightmare" episode, June 2011)

External links
On the Case with Paula Zahn – official website

2000s American television news shows
2010s American television news shows
2020s American television news shows
2009 American television series debuts
2000s American crime television series
2010s American crime television series
2020s American crime television series
Investigation Discovery original programming
True crime television series